In 2021 Silkeborg Municipality had had mayors from 3 different parties since the 2007 municipal reform: the Conservatives from 2007-2009, the Social Democrats from 2010-2013, and Venstre from 2014-2021. The 2021 election was seen as an election that could tilt either way, and was likely to be dependent on the position of the Danish Social Liberal Party. Both Venstre and Social Democrats decreased their vote share, but the Social Democrats didn't lose any seats, while Venstre lost 3 seats, and this meant the Social Democrats would be the biggest party in the following period. On December 10, 2021, a municipal council with Social Democrat Helle Gade as mayor was announced.

Electoral system
For elections to Danish municipalities, a number of candidates varying from 9 to 31, depending on the municipality, are chosen to be elected to the municipal council. The seats are then allocated using the D'Hondt method and a closed-list proportional representation.
Silkeborg Municipality had 31 seats in 2021

Unlike in Danish General Elections, in elections to municipal councils, electoral alliances are allowed.

Electoral alliances  

Electoral Alliance 1

Electoral Alliance 2

Electoral Alliance 3

Results

Notes

References 

Silkeborg